Murfree is a surname. Notable people with the surname include:

Hardy Murfree (1752–1809), military officer from North Carolina during the American Revolutionary War
Mary Noailles Murfree (1850–1922), American fiction writer who wrote under the pen name Charles Egbert Craddock
William H. Murfree (1781–1827), member of the United States House of Representatives from North Carolina

See also
Discovery Center at Murfree Spring, nature center and wetlands boardwalk near downtown Murfreesboro, Tennessee